Warkocz may refer to the following places in Poland:
Warkocz in Gmina Strzelin, Strzelin County in Lower Silesian Voivodeship (SW Poland)
Other places called Warkocz (listed in Polish Wikipedia)